Monticello High School was a public high school in Monticello, Lawrence County, Mississippi.  

It was apparently closed down after the 1986 football season. The school mascot was the Red Devil; the school colors maroon and white. 

The School Room of the Lawrence County Regional Historical Museum houses yearbooks and trophies from this school.

Notable alumni
Mark Green, Republican Representative of Tennessee's 7th congressional district.

References 

Schools in Lawrence County, Mississippi
Former high schools in Mississippi
Public high schools in Mississippi